Kate Valentine may refer to:

 Kate Spade (Katherine Noel Valentine Brosnahan Spade, 1962–2018), also known as Kate Valentine, American fashion designer and entrepreneur
 Kate Valentine, fictional true identity of character Chloe Mitchell in the soap opera The Young and the Restless
 Sister Kate Valentine, a fictional character in Japanese manga series Chrono Crusade